Cheli is an Italian surname. Notable people with the surname include:

Alberto Cheli (born 1951), Italian singer-songwriter and composer
Éric Chéli (born 1966), French former racing driver
Giovanni Cheli (1918–2013), Italian Catholic archbishop and cardinal
Maurizio Cheli (born 1959), Italian air force officer and astronaut
Ralph Cheli (1919–1944), United States Army Air Forces officer and Medal of Honor recipient

Italian-language surnames